The Adelaide Remand Centre is a maximum-security prison facility located in Adelaide, South Australia, used to hold prisoners on remand pending trial. It is located in Currie Street in the Adelaide central business district.  it has a capacity of 274 prisoners in a high-security facility, and is privately managed by Serco.

References

External links
Adelaide Remand Centre

Prisons in Adelaide
1986 establishments in Australia